Preqin is a privately held London-based investment data company that provides financial data and insight on the alternative assets market, as well as tools to support investment in alternatives. By the company's own definition, its data encompasses private capital and hedge funds, including fund, fund manager, investor, performance and deal information. The asset classes it covers are: private equity, venture capital, hedge funds, private debt, real estate, infrastructure, natural resources and secondaries.

History
Preqin launched as ‘Private Equity Intelligence’ in 2003. Founded by Mark O’Hare and Nick Arnott, it began by listing private equity performance data, relying on the Freedom of Information Act (FOIA). As the company expanded it began to collect data for more asset classes, and it now covers private equity, venture capital, hedge funds, private debt, real estate, infrastructure, natural resources and secondaries. It gets most of its data from voluntary contributions and direct contact with market participants.

In August 2021, Preqin fully acquired Colmore, a leading private markets technology, services and administration business.

Preqin won The Queen's Award for Enterprise in International Trade in 2016 and 2019, was a national winner at the 2019 European Business Awards, and was named as part of the Sunday Times International Track 200 in the same year.

Data
Preqin provides data on fundraising, investors, performance, dry powder, AUM and deal flow, as well as information on compensation, fund terms and employment. It publishes research reports that draw from its data and include contributions from alternative investment professionals, as well as Preqin subject experts. In 2018 the business launched a research report titled Women in Alternatives, which detailed underrepresentation of women in the alternative assets industry.  

Preqin is headquartered in London, and has offices in numerous other international locations: Birmingham, New York City, Dallas, Singapore, San Francisco, Hong Kong, Chicago, Tokyo, Sydney, Dubai, Bangalore, Manila and Guangzhou. It has on-the-ground research teams in many of these regions, monitoring and gathering data and information on markets worldwide.

Preqin's methods of data collection include web data extraction, direct conversations with fund managers, on and offshore web research, FOIA requests and manager-initiated data contributions.

Products

Preqin Pro
Preqin Pro is a data platform that provides access to private capital and hedge fund data sets and tools. The platform provides data for application across the investment lifecycle, including market data and information on individual investors, consultants, managers, funds, transactions and service providers. These data sets are supported by tools such as target lists, saved searches, and investor news and alerts.

Preqin Solutions
Formerly Baxon Solutions, Preqin Solutions is Preqin's software product. The software allows users to monitor, analyze and report on their fund portfolios. In 2019 Preqin Solutions was sold to Dynamo Software for an undisclosed fee, and was re-branded Dynamo PMV.

Preqin ESG Solutions
Preqin ESG Solutions offers visibility of ESG factors at a firm, portfolio, and asset level that can be measured, compared, and communicated. This data provides a breakdown of LPs, GPs, and funds' ESG profiles.

Preqin Insights
Preqin's research portal, Insights+, is a subscription product containing all the business’ editorial output such as research reports, blogs, videos and event information. Preqin's best known and most popular reports are its Global Alternatives Reports.

Spotlight 
Preqin's regular newsletter delivers data and analysis on all asset classes to subscribers’ inboxes.

References

Financial services companies established in 2002
Private equity media and publications
Research and analysis firms of the United Kingdom
Financial data vendors